The First Churchills is a BBC serial from 1969 about the life of John Churchill, 1st Duke of Marlborough, and his wife, Sarah Churchill, Duchess of Marlborough.  It stars John Neville as the duke and Susan Hampshire as the duchess, was written and produced by Donald Wilson, and was directed by David Giles. It is notable as being the first programme shown on PBS's long-running Masterpiece series in the United States. Wilson and Giles were fresh from their success in writing and directing The Forsyte Saga, which also starred Susan Hampshire and Margaret Tyzack.

Overview 
The serial presents the lives of John and Sarah Churchill from their meeting in 1673 until a time shortly after the death of Queen Anne in 1714, and illustrates, along the way, much of the context of contemporary English politics.  Like many BBC serials of the era, it was made on a low budget, with sound-studio sets, and generally avoided battle and crowd scenes because they were unable to stage them in a convincing manner. The series is based on a book written by the Marlboroughs' most famous descendant, Winston Churchill's Marlborough: His Life and Times, and as such presents a very favourable portrait of the Marlboroughs.

Episodes
 "The Chaste Nymph"
 "Bridals"
 "Plot Counter-Plot"
 "The Lion and the Unicorn"
 "Rebellion"
 "The Protestant Wind"
 "Trial of Strength"
 "The Queen Commands"
 "Reconciliation"
 "A Famous Victory"
 "Breaking the Circle"
 "Not Without Honour"

Cast

Sarah Churchill, Duchess of Marlborough: Susan Hampshire
John Churchill, 1st Duke of Marlborough: John Neville
King Charles II: James Villiers
King James II: John Westbrook
Queen Mary, wife to James II: Sheila Gish
King William III: Alan Rowe
Queen Mary II: Lisa Daniely
Queen Anne: Margaret Tyzack
Prince George of Denmark: Roger Mutton
King Louis XIV: Robert Robinson
Sidney Godolphin: John Standing
Lord Shaftesbury: Frederick Peisley
Lord Shrewsbury: Job Stewart
James, Duke of Monmouth: James Kerry
Robert Harley: Richard Pearson
Barbara, Duchess of Cleveland: Moira Redmond
Francis Godolphin: Richard Warwick
Henrietta Churchill: Polly Adams
John Wilmot, Earl of Rochester: Graham Armitage
Lord Russell: Colin Bean
Duchess of Portsmouth: Consuela Chapman
Charles Churchill: Michael Culver
Nell Gwyn: Andria Lawrence
D'Artagnan: Michael Lynch
Henrietta Wentworth: Kay Patrick
Marquess of Carmarthen: Arthur Pentelow
Duke of Buckingham: Bruce Purchase
Laurence Hyde, 1st Earl of Rochester: John Ringham
Titus Oates: Nicholas Smith
Henry St John: Michael Attwell
Abigail Masham: Jill Balcon
James Stuart, the Old Pretender: Freddie Wilson
Anne Churchill: Yvonne Antrobus
Charles Spencer, 3rd Earl of Sunderland: Robert Mill
Adam de Cardonnel: William Job
William Cadogan: Bernard Taylor
John Churchill, Marquess of Blandford: Francis Wallis
Anthonie Heinsius: David King
Count Johann Wenzel Wratislaw: Kenneth Ives
Prince Eugene of Savoy: John Saunders
Marshal Tallard: Edward Dentith
Elector of Bavaria: Guy Standeven
Lord Cutts: Donald Sumpter
Margrave of Baden: Clive Cazes
Sir John Vanbrugh: John Carlin
Samuel Masham: Gordon Whiting
Lord Somers: Charles West
Marquis de Torcy: Derek Cox
Duchess of Somerset: Rosina Stewart
Duke of Somerset: Clifford Parrish
Lord Halifax: Austin Trevor
Robert Spencer, 2nd Earl of Sunderland: John Humphry
Lady Sunderland: Lillias Walker
Archbishop Sancroft: Kevin Stoney
Count Bentinck, later Lord Portland: Roger Booth
Robert Young: Davyd Harries
Bishop Sprat: Julian d'Albie
Archbishop Tenison: Graham Leaman
Duke of Gloucester: Michael Reynolds

The serial depicts most of the important political figures of the day.

Music 
The theme for the opening titles of each episode is the "Trumpet tune (Warlike consort)" from Act V of Henry Purcell's opera King Arthur. The theme for the closing credits of each episode is the second piece, a Rondeau, of Henry Purcell's incidental music, composed about 1695, to Aphra Behn's 1676 play Abdelazer, or The Moor's Revenge, perhaps better known as the theme used by Benjamin Britten in The Young Person's Guide to the Orchestra.

DVD
The serial has been released on DVD, distributed by Acorn Media UK.

References

External links

BBC television dramas
British television miniseries
 
Television series set in the 17th century
Television series set in the 18th century
1969 British television series debuts
1969 British television series endings
Cultural depictions of Sarah Churchill, Duchess of Marlborough
Cultural depictions of John Churchill, Duke of Marlborough
Cultural depictions of Anne, Queen of Great Britain
Cultural depictions of Louis XIV
Cultural depictions of Prince Eugene of Savoy
Cultural depictions of Charles de Batz de Castelmore d'Artagnan
Cultural depictions of Titus Oates
Cultural depictions of Charles II of England
War of the Spanish Succession in fiction
Cultural depictions of Barbara Palmer, 1st Duchess of Cleveland
Cultural depictions of Louise de Kérouaille, Duchess of Portsmouth
Cultural depictions of Nell Gwyn
Cultural depictions of James II of England